Eddie Griffin: Going For Broke is an American reality documentary television series on VH1 that debuted September 14, 2009. The series chronicles the life of comedian Eddie Griffin's financial foibles caused by the family and friends he's supporting plus the help he's receiving from his mother, who has moved in with him.

Episodes

References

External links
 Eddie Griffin Official Website

2000s American reality television series
2009 American television series debuts
2009 American television series endings
English-language television shows
VH1 original programming
African-American reality television series